The 2022–23 Pittsburgh Panthers men's basketball team represented the University of Pittsburgh during the 2022–23 NCAA Division I men's basketball season. The Panthers were led by fifth-year head coach Jeff Capel and played their home games at the Petersen Events Center in Pittsburgh, Pennsylvania as members of the Atlantic Coast Conference.

The Panthers finished the season 21–10 overall and 14–6 in ACC play to finish in a three way tie for third place. This season marked a surprise turnaround from previous seasons; at one point, the Panthers were ranked No. 25 in the nation, their first appearance in the top-25 rankings in seven years. As the fifth-seeded team in the ACC tournament, they defeated thirteenth seed Georgia Tech in the Second Round, but were defeated by Duke in the Quarterfinals.

They received an at-large bid to the NCAA tournament, the Panthers' first invitation since 2016. As a No. 11 seed, they defeated Mississippi State in the First Four and upset No. 6 seed Iowa State in the first round, before being defeated by Xavier in the second round, bringing the Panthers' overall record to 24–12, making it Pitt's best season since 2014.

Previous season
The Panthers finished the 2021–22 season 11–21, 6–14 in ACC play to finish in a three way tie for eleventh place. As the twelfth seed in the ACC tournament, they lost to thirteenth seed Boston College in the First Round.  They were not invited to the NCAA tournament or the NIT.

Offseason

Departures

Incoming transfers

Recruiting classes

2022 recruiting class

2023 recruiting class

Roster

Schedule and results

|-
!colspan=9 style=| Exhibition

|-
!colspan=9 style=| Regular season

|-
!colspan=9 style=| ACC Tournament

|-
!colspan=9 style=|NCAA tournament

Source

Rankings

*AP does not release post-NCAA tournament rankings^Coaches did not release a Week 2 poll.

References

Pittsburgh Panthers men's basketball seasons
Pittsburgh
Pittsburgh
Pittsburgh
Pittsburgh